Amr Al-Dabbagh (born 1966) (Arabic:عمرو الدباغ) is a Saudi businessman and politician.

Education
Al-Dabbagh obtained his Bachelor of Business Administration from King Abdulaziz University. He also attended executive programs in management at the Harvard Business School, the Wharton School, the John F. Kennedy School of Government and the London Business School, as well as training programs with Merrill Lynch, Coutts & Co., and Banque Worms.

Career 
Since 1991, Al-Dabbagh has served as chairman and CEO of Al-Dabbagh Group (ADG). The business is a family conglomerate founded in 1962 by his father, Abdullah Mohammed Ali Al-Dabbagh, the former Minister of Agriculture of Saudi Arabia.

Al-Dabbagh served two four-year terms in public service as Governor and chairman of the board of the Saudi Arabian General Investment Authority (SAGIA), with the rank of Minister.

Al-Dabbagh created Philanthropy University, an initiative based in Oakland, California. Philanthropy University, launched on 1 September 2015, offers Massive Open Online Courses (MOOCs) to Global South non-profit leaders. The initiative was created with the collaboration of Laura Tyson, director of the Institute for Business and Social Impact at the Haas School.

Al-Dabbagh was the founding Chairman of the think tank the Jeddah Economic Forum. Al-Dabbagh was appointed to two consecutive 4-year terms as a member of the Regional Council in the Makkah Region of Saudi Arabia and was also elected twice to consecutive 4-year terms as a board member of the Jeddah Chamber of Commerce & Industry. He has previously served as Chairman of the Jeddah Marketing Board.

Corruption charges 

In November 2017, Al-Dabbagh was detained as part of what was called a wide-ranging "anti-corruption" purge that also ensnared Saudi Princes Alwaleed bin Talal and Miteb bin Abdullah. Until 20 December 2018, there was no specific charges against Amr, or any legal proceedings. He was released without charge on 23 January 2019 after an undisclosed settlement with the government.

References

External links
 http://aldabbagh.com/

20th-century Saudi Arabian businesspeople
21st-century Saudi Arabian businesspeople
1966 births
Alumni of London Business School
Harvard Business School alumni
Harvard Kennedy School alumni
King Abdulaziz University alumni
Living people
People from Jeddah